Lee Gissendaner (born October 25, 1971) is currently the player personnel executive for the Green Bay Packers of the National Football League.  He served as a scout with the Green Bay Packers for 17 years (1998-2014) before joining the New York Jets with the same position from 2015-2017. In 2018, Gissendaner would return to Green Bay under the position of player personnel executive.

Gissendaner is a former American and Canadian football wide receiver in the Canadian Football League (CFL) and World League of American Football (WLAF). He was drafted by the Houston Oilers in the sixth round of the 1994 NFL Draft, but did not appear in an NFL game and played for the Toronto Argonauts of the CFL and the Scottish Claymores of the WLAF. He played college football at Northwestern.  Gissendaner was awarded the Chicago Tribune Silver Football as the Big Ten Conference's most valuable player in 1992.

References

1971 births
Living people
American football wide receivers
Canadian football wide receivers
Green Bay Packers scouts
New York Jets scouts
Northwestern Wildcats football players
Scottish Claymores players
Toronto Argonauts players
Players of American football from Akron, Ohio
African-American players of American football
African-American players of Canadian football
21st-century African-American sportspeople
20th-century African-American sportspeople